is a junction railway station in the city of Tokoname, Aichi, Japan, operated by Meitetsu.

Lines
It is also regarded as the terminal station for the Meitetsu Airport Line.

Station layout
The station is an elevated station with two island platforms  and the station building located underneath. The station has automated ticket machines, Manaca automated turnstiles and it is staffed.

Platforms

Adjacent stations

Station history
Tokoname Station was opened on April 1, 1913 as a terminal station on the Aichi Electric Railway Company. The Aichi Electric Railway became part of the Meitetsu group on August 1, 1935. A second platform was added in December 1982, and the station building was rebuilt in 1987. The station was closed from January 2002 to October 2003 to allow for the elevation of the tracks and the construction of a new station building. In January 2005, the Tranpass system of magnetic fare cards with automatic turnstiles was implemented.  The Meitetsu Airport Line also began operations from January 2005.

Passenger statistics
In fiscal 2016, the station was used by an average of 11,284 passengers daily (boarding passengers only).

Surrounding area
Tokoname City Hall
Tokoname Boat Race Stadium

See also
 List of Railway Stations in Japan

References

External links

 Official web page 

Railway stations in Japan opened in 1913
Railway stations in Aichi Prefecture
Stations of Nagoya Railroad
Tokoname